The Charm City Circulator (CCC or Downtown Circulator) is a privately funded, public transit downtown circulator shuttle service giving riders connection to historic sites, parking, and businesses throughout downtown Baltimore for free. The newest transit system in Maryland was established in 2008, but did not begin inaugural service until January 11, 2010 because of funding issues. The system operates four routes on major streets throughout downtown. The system also connects to the city's water taxi and MTA Maryland.

History 
The Charm City Circulator started as a plan by former mayor Sheila Dixon to make Baltimore an eco-friendly city and utilize transport throughout Downtown without the patron spending a dime. The plan was to launch three routes connecting across the inner-city, but delays in bus delivery caused routes to be implemented over 18 months rather than all at once.  Service is seven days-a-week, with ten-minute intervals between buses. On January 11, 2010; the Orange Route became the pilot service for the Charm City Circulator travelling east-west via Pratt Street/Lombard Street, Central Avenue, and Baltimore Street. As soon as three months after service of the first line begin, the "CCC" reached the 100,000 riders milestone. Nearly six months later on June 4, the Purple Route began service travelling north-south via Charles Street & St. Paul/Light Streets. The much anticipated Green Route recently began service just outside downtown connecting City Hall to Johns Hopkins Medical Center via Broadway, Fleet Street, and President Street. On August 15, 2011, the city of Baltimore received $1.6 million in federal funds to expand service to Fort McHenry in early 2012. The "Banner Route" or Blue Route was intended to relieve congestion and make it easier for visitors to get to/from the famous landmark in time for the War of 1812 bicentennial celebration.

Bus routes

Water taxi harbor connector routes

Bus fleet roster 

 All current and future buses in fleet are hybrid or clean-diesel vehicles under the Cleaner, Greener Baltimore Initiative's plan.
 Charm City Circulator (formerly operated by Veolia) bus yard located at 1400 Cherry Hill Road. Two blocks from Cherry Hill light rail stop and connection to MTA bus routes 27, 29, and 51.
As of February 2020, the Charm City Circulator is putting new buses into service manufactured by NovaBus, according to the Baltimore Sun, the City of Baltimore plans to order new buses to fully replace the Orion buses that was put into service in 2012.

References

External links 
 https://transportation.baltimorecity.gov/charm-city-circulator
 http://godowntownbaltimore.com/
 http://baltimorecity.gov/

Maryland Transit Administration
Transportation in Baltimore
Intermodal transportation authorities in Maryland
Passenger rail transportation in Maryland
Bus transportation in Maryland
Rapid transit in Maryland